The discography of British-Irish musician Chris de Burgh consists of 23 studio albums, 9 compilation albums, 4 live albums, and 66 singles, along with 8 videos and DVDs and one box set. His 23 studio albums consist of 19 of completely new material, 2 albums of cover versions, 1 album featuring a mix of new songs, cover versions, and re-recordings and 1 consisting of acoustic versions of previously released tracks. His debut album, Far Beyond These Castle Walls, released in 1974, reached number 1 in Brazil, but failed to chart elsewhere.

De Burgh's first album to chart in the UK Albums Chart was The Getaway, released in 1982, charting at number 30. His earlier albums, Spanish Train and Other Stories and Crusader charted after this success. De Burgh's first album to reach number one in the UK Albums Chart was 1988's Flying Colours, his second top 10 album chart placing after 1986's Into the Light.

Chris de Burgh was signed to A&M Records for many years (1974–2004), but he now has his own label, Ferryman Productions. His recent albums are released by German label, Edel Records.

Albums

Studio albums

Live albums

Compilation albums

Box sets
 Much More Than This (2006)

Singles

1970s

1980s

1 Appeared in album chart as cassette EP

1990s

2000 onwards

1 Download-only singles - no physical releases

Non-album tracks
In addition to the catalogue of songs featured on his studio albums, de Burgh has also recorded a number of songs not included on the original editions of the studio albums. These include new songs featured on compilation albums, soundtracks, live albums, single B-sides, stand-alone singles and songs featured on special edition releases of studio albums.
The songs listed in the table below are available on official releases.

In addition to the songs listed above, professional live recordings exist of live performances by de Burgh of the following songs.

Videography

De Burgh has released 7 live concert videos to date. Only the 2010 Footsteps Live DVD is still in print and available to buy new. Most of the videos are not complete concerts, with only the Munich Concerts VHS from 1985 being close to a full concert recording. Most of these videos are available to view on YouTube.

References

External links
Chris de Burgh Official Website
 
 Entry at 45cat.com

Discographies of British artists
Discographies of Irish artists
Discography